An automated restaurant or robotic restaurant is a restaurant that uses robots to do tasks such as delivering food and drink to the tables and/or cooking the food.

History

Restaurant automation means the use of a restaurant management system to automate the major operations of a restaurant establishment. When discussing commercial restaurant automation, it is hard not to mention Yoshiaki Shiraishi. This Japanese innovator is known for the creation of conveyor belt sushi. He conjured up the idea due to difficulty staffing his small sushi restaurant and managing the restaurant on his own. He got the idea to use conveyor belt technology in sushi after seeing beer bottles on a conveyor belt in an Asahi brewery. Yoshiaki's restaurants are an extremely early example of restaurant automation; they used a conveyor belt to distribute dishes around the restaurant, eliminating the need for waiters. This example of automation dates back to the Japanese economic miracle; the first of Yoshiaki's conveyor belt sushi restaurants was opened under the name Mawaru Genroku Sushi in 1958, in Osaka.

In the early 1970s a number of restaurants served food solely through vending machines. These restaurants were called automats or, in Japan, shokkenki. Customers ordered their food directly through the machines.

As of 2011, across Europe, McDonald's had already begun implementing 7,000 touch screen kiosks that could handle cashiering duties.

More recently, restaurants are opening that have completely or partially automated their services. These may include: taking orders, preparing food, serving, and billing. A few fully automated restaurants operate without any human intervention whatsoever. Robots are designed to help and sometimes replace human labour (such as waiters and chefs). The automation of restaurants  may also allow for the option for greater customization of an order.

In 2020, a restaurant in the Netherlands began trialling the use of a robot to serve guests.

In September 2021, Karakuri’s 'Semblr' food service robot served personalised lunches for the 4,000 employees of grocery technology solutions provider ocado Group's head offices in Hatfield, UK. 2,700 different combinations of dishes were on offer. Customers could specify in grams what hot and cold items, proteins, sauces and fresh toppings they wanted.

In 2021, Columbia University School of Engineering and Applied Science engineers developed a method of cooking 3D printed chicken with software-controlled robotic lasers. The “Digital Food” team exposed raw 3D printed chicken structures to both blue and infrared light. They then assessed the cooking depth, colour development, moisture retention and flavour differences of the laser-cooked 3D printed samples in comparison to stove-cooked meat.

Locations
Automated restaurants have been opening in many countries. Examples include:

 Nala Restaurant in Naperville, Illinois, the world's first fully automated multi-cuisine chef, customizable robots that use machine learning to cook infinite recipes replicated with exact precision anytime, anywhere. 
 Fritz's Railroad Restaurant in Kansas City, Missouri 
 Výtopna, a Railway Restaurant using model trains: franchise of various restaurants and coffeehouses in the Czech Republic 
 Bagger's Restaurant in Nuremberg, Germany 
 FuA-Men Restaurant, a ramen restaurant located in Nagoya, Japan 
 Fōster Nutrition in Buenos Aires, Argentina 
 Dalu Robot Restaurant in Jinan, China 
 Haohai Robot Restaurant in Harbin, China 
 Robot Kitchen Restaurant in Hong Kong 
 Robo-Chef restaurant in Tehran, Iran, started in 2017, is the first robotic and "waiterless" restaurant of the Middle East.
 MIT graduates opened Spyce Kitchens in downtown Boston, Massachusetts, in 2018
 Foodom, under Country Garden Holdings, opened January 12, 2020, in Guangzhou, China
 Robot Chacha, the first robot restaurant of India, is planning to open in the capital city of New Delhi.
 Kura Revolving Sushi Bar, with a number of locations in the United States, uses a tablets at tables for ordering, a conveyor belt to deliver food, and robots to deliver drinks and condiments.
 Chipotle Mexican Grill is beginning to deploy the Hyphen Makeline, which assembles up to 350 bowls and salads automatically per hour, and Chippy, a automatic tortilla chip fryer made by Miso Robotics.

See also
 Automat
 Automation

References

External links
 Manufacturer of Doner Robots - Korkmaz Mechatronic`s Official Website
 's Baggers official website
 Alkadur RobotSystems official website
 CT Asia Robotics official website
 Display Everywhere
 restaurant software
 automated restaurants concepts
 automated restaurants in Spanish university

Restaurants by type
Robotics
Emerging technologies